The 2020–21 Illinois State Redbirds men's basketball team represented Illinois State University during the 2020–21 NCAA Division I men's basketball season. The Redbirds, led by ninth-year head coach Dan Muller, played their home games at Doug Collins Court at Redbird Arena in Normal, Illinois as members of the Missouri Valley Conference. In a season limited due to the ongoing COVID-19 pandemic, they finished the season 7–18, 4–14 in MVC play to finish in 10th place. In the MVC tournament, they lost to Northern Iowa in the first round.

Previous season 
The Redbirds finished the 2019–20 season 10–21, 5–13 in MVC play to finish in ninth place. In the MVC tournament, they lost to Drake in the first round.

Offseason

Departures

2020 recruiting class

Incoming transfers

Roster

NOTE: (L) indicates left team in-season

Schedule and results

|-
!colspan=9 style=|Non-Conference Regular Season

|-
!colspan=9 style=|Missouri Valley Conference Regular Season

|-
!colspan=9 style=|State FarmMissouri Valley Conference {MVC} tournament

Source

NOTE: limited capacity or no spectators allowed per the corresponding local COVID-19 health guidelines.

References

Illinois State Redbirds
Illinois State Redbirds men's basketball seasons
Illinois State Redbirds men's basketball
Illinois State Redbirds men's basketball